This is a list of tennis players who have represented the France Davis Cup team in an official Davis Cup match. France have taken part in the competition since 1904.

Players

References

Davis Cup
Lists of Davis Cup tennis players